Vancouver City Council is the governing body of Vancouver, British Columbia. The council consists of a mayor and ten councillors elected to serve a four-year term. Monthly, a deputy mayor is appointed from among the councillors. The current mayor is Ken Sim, who leads the party ABC Vancouver. City council meetings are held in Vancouver City Hall. The most recent election was on October 15, 2022.

Structure
Unlike many other cities of its size, all Vancouver city councillors are elected at-large, rather than being elected to represent municipal wards. A proposal to move to a conventional ward system was rejected by voters in a 2004 referendum. The mayor chairs council meetings and appoints members to regional boards, such as the Metro Vancouver Board of Directors.

The Vancouver Charter outlines the structure, powers and responsibility of the city council. Under the charter, the mayor and City Council have the power to:
 Pass by-laws regulating such things as businesses, building, noise, and land use
 Buy and sell property
 Collect property taxes and other taxes
 Approve major spending for all parts of the City government
 Take on debt
 Allocate funds for special activities, such as arts and community services
 Set up departments and offices for City services
 Hire staff for City departments and offices

Council also maintains a number of standing committees which meet to deliberate on specific topics and hear from speakers. Examples include the City Finance and Services Committee and the Policy and Strategic Priorities Committee. Each committee consists of the entire City Council. City Council also holds public hearings for spot rezonings.

Membership

Since 2022

2018–2022

2014–2018

2011–2014

2008–2011

2005–2008

2002–2005

Notes

References

External links
 Vancouver City Council
 Vancouver's elected representatives, by Wayne D. Madden A compilation of election results for Vancouver, British Columbia at the municipal, provincial and federal levels through 2002. Available on Internet Archive.

Municipal councils in British Columbia
Municipal government of Vancouver